The Chief of Staff (COS) is the professional head of the Barbados Defence Force and the most senior uniformed military adviser to the Prime Minister of Barbados (Chairman of the 
Defence Board and Minister of National Security). The office of the (COS) is  responsible for the administrative and operational control of the Barbados military and is based at St. Ann's Fort The Garrison, Saint Michael.

List of Chiefs

References

Military of Barbados
Barbados